Rangitata is a genus of South Pacific intertidal spiders containing the single species, Rangitata peelensis. It was  first described by Raymond Robert Forster & C. L. Wilton in 1973, and has only been found in New Zealand.

References

External links

Desidae
Spiders described in 1973
Taxa named by Raymond Robert Forster